Opposite Direction is an Italian-Venezuelan film released in 2020, directed by Alejandro Bellame Palacios and starring Claudia Rojas, Christian González and Erick Palacios. In the film "Eugenia, 30, is torn between fulfilling or not a promise she made 13 years ago to Luis, her brief and tragic adolescent love."

Awards 
The film was nominated for the 36th Goya Awards in 2022, for the Best Ibero-American Film category. It received the 3rd place in the Audience Choice Awards of the Chicago Latino Film Festival. In the 17th Venezuelan Film Festival the film was the winner in eight categories, including Best Cinematography, Best Screenplay, Best Fiction Feature, Best Actress, Best Supporting Actress, Best Supporting Actor, Best Makeup, Audience Choice Award; and in the Seattle Latino Film Festival it was the winner in seven categories, including Best Narrative, Best Director, Best Actress, Best Supporting Actor, Best Supporting Actress, Best Editing.

References

External links 
 
 Dirección Opuesta at Film Affinity

2020 films
Venezuelan drama films
Italian romantic drama films
2020s road movies